Reinaldo Colucci (born 29 October 1985) is a Brazilian triathlete.

He competed at the 2008 Summer Olympics men's triathlon, where he finished in 37th place and at the 2012 Summer Olympics men's triathlon, where he finished in 35th place. Colucci won the gold medal at the 2011 Pan American Games in Guadalajara and finished 21st at the 2015 Pan American Games.

References 

1985 births
Living people
Brazilian male triathletes
Triathletes at the 2008 Summer Olympics
Triathletes at the 2012 Summer Olympics
Olympic triathletes of Brazil
Triathletes at the 2011 Pan American Games
Pan American Games gold medalists for Brazil
Pan American Games medalists in triathlon
Triathletes at the 2015 Pan American Games
Medalists at the 2011 Pan American Games
Sportspeople from São Paulo (state)
20th-century Brazilian people
21st-century Brazilian people
People from Descalvado